"Falling to Pieces" is a 1990 song by Faith No More.

Falling to Pieces may also refer to:

"Falling to Pieces" (Firewind song), 2006
 "Breakeven (Falling to Pieces)", by The Script, 2008
"Falling to Pieces", a song by Rita Ora from the deluxe version of her 2018 album Phoenix
"Falling to Pieces", a song by Marshmello and Crankdat from the 2019 album Joytime III

See also
Fall to Pieces (disambiguation)